Snehal Kauthankar (born 19 October 1995) is an Indian cricketer who plays for Goa. He made his Twenty20 debut on 3 January 2016 in the 2015–16 Syed Mushtaq Ali Trophy. He made his List A debut for Goa in the 2016–17 Vijay Hazare Trophy on 25 February 2017.

He was the leading run-scorer for Goa in the 2018–19 Vijay Hazare Trophy, with 270 runs in six matches.

References

External links
 

1995 births
Living people
Indian cricketers
Goa cricketers
Place of birth missing (living people)